There have been three kinds of Bavarian consorts in history, Duchesses, Electresses and Queens. Most consorts listed are Duchesses. The first ever consort of Bavaria was Waldrada in the 6th century. The final consort was Maria Theresia of Austria-Este in 1913.

The longest serving House was the Wittelsbach Dynasty, who played a major role in Bavarian History. During the medieval period under the Wittelsbach Dynasty, Bavaria was split into two parts, Upper and Lower Bavaria. This meant that there may have been more than one Duchess of Bavaria at the same time, due to messy inheritance among heirs. Three of the break-away Wittelsbach families were: Landshut, Munich and Ingolstadt.

Since 555 there have been 99 Bavarian consorts: 78 duchesses, 11 queens, 10 electresses and one margravine. The number doesn't add up because Elizabeth of Lorraine and Caroline of Baden, held two titles.  There was a few consort that married twice usually their brothers-in-law.  It was common for the ruler of Bavaria to have more than one wife. His wives may have died childless or they divorced, because the marriage was childless. Most of the marriages were to make a treaty with the family of the consort.

Ducal Bavaria

{| width=95% class="wikitable"
| colspan="9" bgcolor=#E6E6AA align=center| Agilolfing Dynasty
|-
!width = "8%" | Image
!width = "10%" | Name
!width = "9%" | Father
!width = "10%" | Birth
!width = "9%" | Marriage
!width = "9%" | Became Duchess
!width = "9%" | Ceased to be Duchess
!width = "9%" | Death
!width = "6%" | Husband
|-
|align="center"| 
|align="center"| Waldrada of the Lombards
|align="center"| Wacho, King of the Lombards(Lethings)
|align=center| c. 531
|align="center" colspan="2"| c. 556
|align="center" colspan="2"| c. 572
|align="center"| Garibald I
|-
|align="center" colspan="9"| No names of Bavarian duchesses are mention during until 610.
|-
|align="center"|
|align="center"| Geila of Friuli
|align="center"| Gisulf II, Duke of Friuli
|align=center| ?
|align=center| ?
|align=center| c. 610husband's accession
|align=center| c. 625/630husband's death
|align=center| ?
|align="center"| Garibald II
|-
|align="center" colspan="9"| Bavarian duchesses or dukes for a half of a century after Garibald II is not very clear until Folchiade of Salzeburg.
|-
|align="center"|
|align="center"| Fara of Bavaria 
|align="center"| A King of the Lombards
|align=center| ?
|align=center| ?
|align=center| ?
|align=center| ?
|align=center| ?
|align="center" rowspan="2"| Theodo I
|-
|align="center"|
|align="center"| Gleisnod de Friuli
|align="center"| ?
|align=center| ?
|align=center| ?
|align=center| ?
|align=center| ?
|align=center| ?
|-
|align="center"|
|align="center"| Folchiade of Salzeburg
|align="center"| ?
|align=center| ?
|align=center| ?
|align=center| ?
|align=center| ?
|align=center| ?
|align="center" rowspan="2"| Theodo II
|-
|align="center" rowspan="2"|
|align="center" rowspan="2"| Regintrude of Austrasia
|align="center" rowspan="2"|  Dagobert I, King of the Franks?(Merovingians)?
|align="center" rowspan="2"|  c. 660–665
|align=center| ?
|align=center| ?
|align=center| c. 716husband's death
|align="center" rowspan="2"| c. 730–740
|-
|align=center| ?
|align=center| c. 716husband's accession
|align=center| c. 719husband's death
|align="center"| Theodbert
|-
|align="center"|
|align="center"| Waldrada
|align="center"| ?
|align=center| ?
|align=center| ?
|align=center| c. 716husband's accession
|align=center| c. 719husband's death
|align=center| ?
|align="center" rowspan="2"| Theobald
|-
|align="center"|
|align="center"| Biltrude
|align="center"| ?
|align=center| ?
|align=center| ?
|align=center| c. 716husband's accession
|align=center| c. 719husband's death
|align=center| ?
|-
|align="center"|
|align="center"| Waldrada
|align="center"| ?
|align=center| ?
|align=center| ?
|align=center| c. 716husband's accession
|align=center| c. 719husband's death
|align=center| ?
|align="center" rowspan="2"| Tassilo II
|-
|align="center"|
|align="center"| Imma of Alamannia
|align="center"| ?
|align=center| ?
|align=center| ?
|align=center| c. 716husband's accession
|align=center| c. 719husband's death
|align=center| c. 750
|-
|align="center"|
|align="center"| Biltrude
|align="center"| ?
|align=center| ?
|align="center" colspan="2"| somewhere after 719
|align=center| c. 725husband's accession as Duke of All Bavaria
|align=center| after 725
|align="center"| Grimoald
|-
|align="center"|
|align="center"| Hiltrud of the Franks
|align="center"|  Charles Martel, Duke and Prince of the Franks(Carolingians)
|align=center| c. 715/720
|align="center" colspan="2"| c. 741
|align=center| 18 January 748husband's death
|align=center| c. 754
|align="center"| Odilo
|-
|align="center"|
|align="center"| Unnamed mother of his two sons
|align="center"| ?
|align="center"| ?
|align="center"| 753husband usurped power
|align="center"| 753husband lost power
|align="center"| ?
|align="center"| ?
|align="center"| Grifo
|-
|align="center"| 
|align="center"| Liutperga of the Lombards
|align="center"| Desiderius, King of the Lombards
|align=center| c. 715/720
|align="center" colspan="2"| before 770
|align=center| c. 788husband and herself deposed and enter monastery
|align=center| c. 793
|align="center"| Tassilo III
|-
| colspan="9" bgcolor=#AACC99 align=center| Carolingian Dynasty
|-
!Image
!Name
!Father
!Born
!Married
!BecameConsort
!Ceased tobe Consort
!Died
!Husband
|-
|align="center"|
|align="center"| Fastrada of Franconia
|align="center"| Raoul III of Franconia
|align="center"| c. 765
|align="center" colspan="2"| c. 784as sole-Queen consort of the Franks and co-Queen consort the Lombardsc. 788 husband became ruler of Bavaria
|align="center" colspan="2"| 10 October 794
|align="center" rowspan="2"| Charlemagne, Emperor and King of the Franks
|-
|align="center"|
|align="center"| Luitgard of Sundgau
|align="center"| Luitfrid II, Count of Sundgau(Etichonids)
|align="center"| c. 776
|align="center" colspan="2"| c. 794as sole-Queen consort of the Franks and co-Queen consort of the Lombards
|align="center" colspan="2"| 4 June 800
|-
|align="center"|
|align="center"| Ermengarde of Hesbaye
|align="center"| Ingerman, Count of Hesbaye(Robertians)
|align="center"| c. 778
|align="center"| c. 794/5
|align="center"| c. 813as Holy Roman Empress and Queen consort of the Franksc. 817as senior Holy Roman Empress
|align="center"| c. 817son became king of Bavaria
|align="center"| 3 October 818
|align="center"| Louis the Pious, Emperor and King of the Franks
|-
|align="center"|
|align="center"| Emma of Altdorf
|align="center"| Welf, Count of Altorf(Elder Welfs)
|align="center"| c. 808
|align="center" colspan="2"| c. 827as Queen consort of BavariaAugust 843as Queen consort of the East Franks
|align="center" colspan="2"| 31 January 876
|align="center"| Louis the German, King of the East Franks and Bavaria
|-
|align="center"| 
|align="center"| Liutgard of Saxony
|align="center"| Liudolf, Duke of the Eastern Saxons(Liudolfings)
|align="center"| c. 845
|align="center"| 29 November 874
|align="center"| 28 August 876as Queen consort of Saxony29 September 880as Queen consort of Bavaria
|align="center"| 20 January 882husband's death
|align="center"| 17 November 885
|align="center"| Louis the Younger, King of Saxony and Bavaria
|-
|align="center"| 
|align="center"| Richardis of Swabia
|align="center"| Erchanger, Count of the Nordgau(Ahalolfings)
|align="center"| c. 840
|align="center"| c. 862
|align="center"| 29 November 874 as Queen consort of Alemannia12 February 881as Holy Roman Empress20 January 882as Queen consort of the East Franks12 December 884as Queen consort of the West Franks
|align="center"| 17 November 887husband's desposition
|align="center"| 18 September, between 894 and 896
|align="center"| Charles the Fat, Emperor and King of the Franks
|-
|align="center"|
|align="center"| Ota of Neustria
|align="center"| Berengar I of Neustria(Conradines)
|align="center"| c. 874
|align="center"| c. 888
|align="center"| c. 888as Queen consort of the East Franks 22 February 896as Holy Roman Empress and Queen consort of Italy
|align="center"| 8 December 899husband's death
|align="center"| 899–903
|align="center"| Arnulf of Carinthia,Emperor and King of the East Franks
|-
| colspan="9" bgcolor=#CCEEFF align=center| Luitpolding Dynasty
|-
!Image
!Name
!Father
!Born
!Married
!BecameConsort
!Ceased tobe Consort
!Died
!Husband
|-
|align="center"|
|align="center"| Cunigunde of Swabia
|align="center"| Berthold I, Count Palatine of Swabia(Ahalolfings)
|align="center"| c. 870/880
|align="center"| ?
|align="center"| ?as Margravine of Bavaria
|align="center"| 4 July 907husband's death
|align="center"| ?
|align="center"| Luitpold
|-
|align="center"|
|align="center"| Judith of Friuli
|align="center"| Saint Eberhard, Duke of Friuli(Unruochings)
|align="center"| c. 888
|align="center" colspan="2"| c. 910
|align="center"| 14 July 937husband's death
|align="center"| ?
|align="center"| Arnulf
|-
|align="center"|
|align="center"| Biltrude
|align="center"| ?
|align="center"| ?
|align="center"| ?
|align="center"| c. 938 husband's accession
|align="center"| 23 November 947husband's death
|align="center"| ?
|align="center"| Berthold
|-
| colspan="9" bgcolor=#FFFFCC align=center| Ottonian Dynasty
|-
!Image
!Name
!Father
!Born
!Married
!BecameDuchess
!Ceased tobe Duchess
!Died
!Husband
|-
|align="center"|
|align="center"| Judith, Duchess of Bavaria
|align="center"| Arnulf(Luitpoldings)
|align="center"| c. 925
|align="center"| ?
|align="center"| 23 November 947 husband's accession
|align="center"| 1 November 955husband's death
|align="center"| June soon after 985
|align="center"| Henry I
|-
|align="center"|
|align="center"| Gisela of Burgundy
|align="center"| Conrad I of Burgundy(Elder Welfs)
|align="center"| before 952
|align="center" colspan="2"| before 972
|align="center"| c. 976husband's desposition
|align="center"| 21 July 1006
|align="center"| Henry II
|-
| colspan="9" bgcolor=#CCEEFF align=center| Luitpolding Dynasty
|-
| colspan="9" bgcolor=#FFFFCC align=center| Ottonian Dynasty
|-
!Image
!Name
!Father
!Born
!Married
!BecameDuchess
!Ceased tobe Duchess
!Died
!Husband
|-
|align="center"|
|align="center"| Gisela of Burgundy
|align="center"| Conrad I of Burgundy(Elder Welfs)
|align="center"| before 952
|align="center"| before 972
|align="center"| c. 985 husband's restoration
|align="center"| 28 August 995husband's death
|align="center"| 21 July 1006
|align="center"| Henry II
|-
|align="center"| 
|align="center"| Saint Cunigunde of Luxembourg
|align="center"| Siegfried, Count of Luxembourg(Elder Luxembourg)
|align="center"| c. 975
|align="center" colspan="2"|  c. 1000
|align="center"| c. 1004Bavaria given to Henry V
|align="center"| 3 March 1040
|align="center"| Henry IV
|-
| colspan="9" bgcolor=purple align=center| Luxembourg Dynasty
|-
| colspan="9" bgcolor=#f2e0ce align=center| Salian Dynasty
|-
!Image
!Name
!Father
!Born
!Married
!BecameDuchess
!Ceased tobe Duchess
!Died
!Husband
|-
|align="center"| 
|align="center"| Gunhilda Knutsdotter of Denmark
|align="center"| Knut the Great(Denmark)
|align="center"| c. 975
|align="center" colspan="2"| May 1035/1036
|align="center" colspan="2"| 18 July 1038
|align="center"| Henry VI
|-
| colspan="9" bgcolor=purple align=center| Luxembourg Dynasty
|-
| colspan="9" bgcolor=yellow green align=center| Ezzonian Dynasty
|-
!Image
!Name
!Father
!Born
!Married
!BecameDuchess
!Ceased tobe Duchess
!Died
!Husband
|-
|align="center"|
|align="center"| Judith of Schweinfurt
|align="center"| Otto III, Duke of Swabia
|align="center"| ?
|align="center" colspan="2"| ?
|align="center"| c. 1053Bavaria given to Henry V
|align="center"| c. 1104
|align="center"| Conrad I
|-
| colspan="9" bgcolor=#f2e0ce align=center| Salian Dynasty
|-
| colspan="9" bgcolor=periwinkle align=center| Northeim Dynasty
|-
!Image
!Name
!Father
!Born
!Married
!BecameDuchess
!Ceased tobe Duchess
!Died
!Husband
|-
|align="center"|
|align="center"| Richenza of Swabia
|align="center"| Otto II, Duke of Swabia(Ezzonids)
|align="center"| c. 1020/1025
|align="center"| c. 1050
|align="center"| c. 1061Bavaria granted to husband
|align="center"| c. 1070Bavaria taken from husband
|align="center"|  c. 1083
|align="center"| Otto of Nordheim
|-
| colspan="9" bgcolor=#FFB6B6 align=center| Welf Dynasty
|-
!Image
!Name
!Father
!Born
!Married
!BecameDuchess
!Ceased tobe Duchess
!Died
!Husband
|-
|align="center"|
|align="center"| Ethelinde of Northeim
|align="center"| Otto of Nordheim(Northeim)
|align="center"| c. 1160
|align="center"| c. 1062
|align="center" colspan="2"| c. 1070
|align="center"| ?
|align="center" rowspan="2"| Welf I
|-
|align="center"| 
|align="center"| Judith of Flanders
|align="center"| Baldwin IV, Count of Flanders(Flanders)
|align="center"| c. 1030
|align="center" colspan="2"| c. 1071
|align="center"| May 1077Bavaria deprived from husband
|align="center"| 5 March 1095
|-
| colspan="9" bgcolor=#f2e0ce align=center| Salian Dynasty
|-
!Image
!Name
!Father
!Born
!Married
!BecameDuchess
!Ceased tobe Duchess
!Died
!Husband
|-
|align="center"| 
|align="center"| Bertha of Savoy
|align="center"| Otto, Count of Savoy(Savoy)
|align="center"| 21 September 1051
|align="center"| 13 July 1066
|align="center"| 1077Bavaria taken back from Welf I
|align="center" colspan="2"| 27 December 1087
|align="center" rowspan="2"| Henry VIII
|-
|align="center"|
|align="center"| Eupraxia Vsevolovna of Kiev
|align="center"| Vsevolod I, Grand Prince of Kiev(Rurikids)
|align="center"| c. 1071
|align="center" colspan="2"| 14 August 1089
|align="center"| c. 1096Bavaria given to Welf I
|align="center"| 20 July 1109
|-
| colspan="9" bgcolor=#FFB6B6 align=center| Welf Dynasty
|-
!Image
!Name
!Father
!Born
!Married
!BecameDuchess
!Ceased tobe Duchess
!Died
!Husband
|-
|align="center"| 
|align="center"| Matilda of Canossa
|align="center"| Boniface III, Margrave of Tuscany(Canossa)
|align="center"| c. 1046
|align="center"| c. 1089
|align="center"| 6 November 1101 husband's accession
|align="center" colspan="2"| 24 July 1115
|align="center"| Welf II
|-
|align="center"| 
|align="center"| Wulfhilde of Saxony
|align="center"| Magnus, Duke of Saxony(Billung)
|align="center"| c. 1075
|align="center"| c. 1095/1100
|align="center"| c. 1120 husband's accession
|align="center"| early 1126husband abdicated as duke and retired to Weingarten Abbey
|align="center"| 29 December 1126
|align="center"| Henry IX
|-
|align="center"| 
|align="center"| Gertrude of Süpplingenburg
|align="center"| Lothair III, Holy Roman Emperor(Süpplingenburg)
|align="center"| 18 April 1115
|align="center" colspan="2"| 29 May 1127
|align="center"| 20 October 1139 husband's death
|align="center"| 18 April 1143
|align="center"| Henry X
|-
| colspan="9" bgcolor=red align=center| Babenberg Dynasty
|-
!Image
!Name
!Father
!Born
!Married
!BecameConsort
!Ceased tobe Consort
!Died
!Husband
|-
|align="center"|
|align="center"| Maria of Bohemia
|align="center"| Soběslav I, Duke of Bohemia(Přemyslids)
|align="center"| c. 1024/25
|align="center"| 28 September 1138
|align="center"| c. 1139 Bavaria granted to husband
|align="center"| 18 October 1141 husband's death
|align="center"| c. 1160
|align="center"| Leopold I
|-
|align="center" rowspan="2"| 
|align="center"| Gertrude of Süpplingenburg
|align="center"| Lothair III, Holy Roman Emperor(Süpplingenburg)
|align="center"| 18 April 1115
|align="center" colspan="2"| 1 May 1142
|align="center" colspan="2"| 18 April 1143
|align="center" rowspan="2"| Henry XI
|-
|align="center"| Theodora Komnene
|align="center"| Sebastokrator Andronikos Komnenos(Komnenos)
|align="center"| –
|align="center" colspan="2"| 1148
|align="center"| 17 September 1156Privilegium Minus
|align="center"| 2 January 1184
|-
| colspan="9" bgcolor=#FFB6B6 align=center| Welf Dynasty
|-
!Image
!Name
!Father
!Born
!Married
!BecameDuchess
!Ceased tobe Duchess
!Died
!Husband
|-
|align=center| 
|align=center| Clementia of Zähringen
|align="center"| Conrad, Duke of Zähringen(Zähringen)
|align="center"|-
|align="center"|1148/49
|align="center"|17 September 1156Privilegium Minus
|align="center"| 1162divorce
|align="center"|1148/49
|align="center" rowspan="2"| Henry XII
|-
|align="center"| 
|align=center| Matilda of England
|align="center"| Henry II of England(Plantagenet)
|align="center"| June 1156
|align="center" colspan="2"| 1 February 1168
|align="center"| 1180 husband lost the duchy'
|align="center"| 28 June 1189
|-
| colspan="9" bgcolor=#FFDEAD align=center| Wittelsbach Dynasty
|-
!Image
!Name
!Father
!Born
!Married
!BecameConsort
!Ceased tobe Consort
!Died
!Husband
|-
|align=center| 
|align=center| Agnes of Loon
|align="center"| Louis I, Count of Loon(Loon)
|align="center"| c. 1150
|align="center"| c. 1157/1169
|align="center"| 16 September 1180Bavaria given to husband|align="center"| 11 July 1183husband's death|align="center"| 26 March 1191
|align="center"| Otto I Wittelsbach
|-
|align="center"| 
|align="center"| Ludmilla of Bohemia
|align="center"| Frederick, Duke of Bohemia(Přemyslids)
|align="center"| 1170
|align="center" colspan="2"| October 1204
|align=center| 15 September 1231husband's death|align=center| 14 August 1240
|align=center| Louis I
|-
|align=center| 
|align=center| Agnes of the Palatinate
|align="center"| Henry V, Count Palatine of the Rhine(Welf)
|align="center"| c. 1201
|align="center"| May 1222
|align=center| 15 September 1231husband's accession|align="center"| 29 November 1253husband's death|align="center"| 16 November 1267
|align="center"| Otto II Wittelsbach
|-
|align="center" colspan="9"| Bavaria partitioned into Upper and Lower Bavaria.
|-
|align=center| 
|align=center| Elizabeth of Hungary
|align="center"| Béla IV of Hungary(Árpád)
|align="center"| c. 1236
|align="center"| c. 1250
|align=center| 29 November 1253husband's accession|align="center" colspan="2"| 24 October 1271
|align="center"| Henry XIII(Lower Bavaria)
|-
|align=center| 
|align=center| Maria of Brabant
|align="center"| Henry II, Duke of Brabant(Leuven)
|align="center"| 1226
|align="center" colspan="2"| 2 August 1254
|align="center" colspan="2"| 18 January 1256
|align="center" rowspan="3"| Louis II(Upper Bavaria)
|-
|align=center| 
|align=center| Anna of Glogau
|align="center"| Konrad I, Duke of Silesia-Glogau(Piast)
|align="center"| 1250/52
|align="center" colspan="2"| 24 August 1260
|align="center" colspan="2"| 25 June 1271
|-
|align=center| 
|align=center| Matilda of Habsburg
|align="center"| Rudolph I of Germany(Habsburg)
|align="center"| 1252
|align="center" colspan="2"| 24 October 1273
|align="center"| 2 February 1294husband's death|align="center"| 23 December 1304
|-
|align=center| 
|align=center| Isabelle of Lorraine
|align="center"| Frederick III, Duke of Lorraine(Metz)
|align="center"| ?
|align="center"| c. 1287
|align="center"| 3 February 1290husband's accession|align=center| 9 October 1296 husband's death|align="center"| c. 1335
|align="center"| Louis III(Lower Bavaria)
|-
|align=center| 
|align=center| Jutta of Schweidnitz
|align="center"| Bolko I, Duke of Jawor and Świdnica(Piast)
|align="center"| c. 1285/87
|align="center" colspan="2"| c. 1297/99
|align=center| 10 December 1310husband's death|align="center"| 15 September 1320
|align="center"| Stephen I(Lower Bavaria)
|-
|align=center| 
|align=center| Agnes of Glogau
|align="center"| Henry III, Duke of Silesia-Glogau(Piast)
|align="center"| c. 1293/96
|align="center" colspan="2"| 18 May 1309
|align=center|  9 November 1312husband's death|align="center"| 25 December 1361
|align="center"| Otto III(Lower Bavaria)
|-
|align="center"| 
|align="center"| Mechtild of Nassau
|align="center"| Adolf, King of the Romans(Nassau)
|align="center"| before 1280
|align="center" colspan="2"| 1 September 1294
|align="center"|  c. 1317husband's desposition|align="center"| 19 June 1323
|align="center"| Rudolf I(Upper Bavaria)
|-

|align="center"| 
|align="center"| Beatrix of Świdnica
|align="center"| Bolko I, Duke of Jawor and Świdnica(Piast)
|align="center"| 1290/2
|align="center" colspan="2"| 14 October 1308/11as Duchess consort of Upper Bavaria
|align="center" colspan="2"| 25 August 1322
|align="center" rowspan="2"| Louis IV(United Bavaria)
|-
|align="center"| 
|align="center"| Margaret of Holland
|align="center"| William I, Count of Hainaut(Avesnes)
|align="center"| 1311
|align="center" colspan="2"| 26 February 1324as Duchess consort of Upper Bavaria20 December 1340as Duchess consort of Lower BavariaJanuary 1341as Duchess consort of All Bavaria
|align="center"| 11 October 1347 husband's death|align="center"| 23 June 1356
|-
|align=center| 
|align=center| Richardis of Jülich
|align="center"| Gerhard V of Jülich(Jülich)
|align="center"| c. 1314
|align="center" colspan="2"| c. 1330
|align=center| 14 December 1334husband's death|align="center"| c. 1360
|align="center"| Otto IV(Lower Bavaria)
|-
|align=center| 
|align=center| Margaret of Bohemia
|align="center"| John I of Bohemia(Luxembourg)
|align="center"| 8 July 1313
|align="center" colspan="2"| 2 August 1328
|align=center| 1 September 1339husband's death|align="center"| 11 July 1341
|align="center"| Henry XIV(Lower Bavaria)
|-
|align=center| 
|align=center| Anna of Austria
|align="center"| Frederick I, Duke of Austria(Habsburg)
|align="center"| c. 1318
|align="center" colspan="2"| c. 1326–1328
|align=center| 18 June 1333husband's death|align="center"| 14/15 December 1343
|align="center"| Henry XV(Upper Bavaria)
|-
|align="center" colspan="9"| Bavaria reunited in 1341 under Louis IV.  It passed to his six sons in this state, in 1347, until it was repartitioned into Upper and Lower Bavaria with each brother co-ruling with each other, in 1349.
|-
|align=center| 
|align=center| Margarete Maultasch
|align="center"| Henry of Bohemia(Meinhardiner)
|align="center"| c. 1318
|align="center"| 10 February 1342
|align="center"| 11 October 1347as Duchess consort of Bavariac. 1349as Duchess consort of Upper Bavaria
|align=center| 18 September 1361husband's death|align="center"| 3 October 1369
|align="center"| Louis V(Bavaria and 2nd Partition)
|-
|align=center| 
|align=center| Elisabeth of Sicily
|align="center"| Frederick III of Sicily(Barcelona)
|align="center"| c. 1310
|align="center"| 27 June 1328
|align="center"| 11 October 1347as Duchess consort of Bavariac. 1349as Duchess consort of Lower Bavaria
|align="center" colspan="2"| c. 1349
|align="center" rowspan="2"| Stephen II(Bavaria and 2nd Partition)
|-
|align=center| 
|align=center| Margarete of Nuremberg
|align="center"| John II, Burgrave of Nuremberg(Hohenzollern)
|align="center"| c. 1315
|align="center" colspan="2"| 14 February 1359as Duchess consort of Bavaria-Landshut13 January 1363as Duchess consort of Upper Bavaria
|align="center"| 13 May 1375husband's death|align="center"| 19 September 1377
|-
|align=center| 
|align=center| Cunigunde of PolandAlso Electress consorts of Brandenburg.
|align="center"| Casimir III of Poland(Piast)
|align="center"| c. 1334
|align="center"| 1 January 1352
|align="center"| 11 October 1347as Duchess consort of Upper Bavaria
|align="center" colspan="2"| 26 April 1357
|align="center" rowspan="2"| Louis VI(Bavaria and 2nd Partition)
|-
|align=center| 
|align=center| Ingeborg of Mecklenburg-Schwerin
|align="center"| Albert II, Duke of Mecklenburg(Mecklenburg-Schwerin)
|align="center"| c. 1340
|align="center" colspan="2"| 15 February 1360as Duchess consort of Upper Bavaria
|align="center"| 17 May 1365husband's death|align="center"| 25 July 1395
|-
|align=center| 
|align=center| Maud of LancasterAlso Countess consorts of Holland.
|align="center"| Henry of Grosmont, 1st Duke of Lancaster(Plantagenet)
|align="center"| 4 April 1339
|align="center" colspan="2"| c. 1352as Duchess consort of Lower Bavariac. 1353as Duchess consort of Bavaria-Straubing
|align="center" colspan="2"| 10 April 1362
|align="center"| William I(Bavaria and 2nd Partition)
|-
|align=center| 
|align=center| Margaret of Legnica-Brzeg
|align="center"| Ludwik I, Duke of Legnica-Brzeg(Piast)
|align="center"| c. 1342/1343
|align="center" colspan="2"| after 19 July 1353as Duchess consort of Bavaria-Straubing
|align="center" colspan="2"| February 1386
|align="center" rowspan="2"| Albert I(Bavaria and 2nd Partition)
|-
|align=center| 
|align=center| Margaret of Cleves
|align="center"| Adolph I, Count of Cleves(De la Marck)
|align="center"| c. 1375
|align="center" colspan="2"| c. 1394 as Duchess consort of Bavaria-Straubing
|align="center"| 13 December 1404husband's death|align="center"| 14 May 1411
|-
|align=center| 
|align=center| Katharine of Bohemia
|align="center"| Charles IV, Holy Roman Emperor(Luxembourg)
|align="center"| 19 August 1342
|align="center" colspan="2"| 19 March 1366as Duchess consort of Upper Bavaria13 May 1375as Duchess consort of Bavaria-Straubing
|align="center"| 15 November 1379husband's death|align="center"| 26 April 1395
|align="center"| Otto V(Bavaria and 2nd Partition)
|-
|align=center| 
|align=center| Margaret of Austria
|align="center"| Albert II, Duke of Austria(Habsburg)
|align="center"| c. 1346
|align="center"| 4 September 1359
|align="center"| 18 September 1361as Duchess consort of Upper Bavaria
|align="center"| 13 January 1363husband's death|align="center"| 14 January 1366
|align="center"| Meinhard(Upper Bavaria)
|-
|align=center| 
|align=center| Katharina of Görz
|align="center"| Meinhard VI, Count of Görz(Görz)
|align="center"| c. 1346
|align="center"| c. 1372
|align="center"| 13 May 1375as Duchess consort of Bavaria-Landshut
|align="center" colspan="2"| c. 1391
|align="center"| John II(Bavaria-Munich)
|-
|align=center| 
|align=center| Anna of Neuffen
|align="center"| Berthold VII of Neuffen(Neuffen)
|align="center"| ?
|align="center"| 16 May 1360
|align="center"| 13 May 1375as Duchess consort of Bavaria-Landshut
|align="center" colspan="2"| c. 1381
|align="center" rowspan="2"| Frederick(Bavaria-Landshut)
|-
|align=center| 
|align=center| Maddalena Visconti
|align="center"| Bernabò Visconti, Lord of Milan(Visconti)
|align="center"| c. 1366
|align="center" colspan="2"| 2 September 1381as Duchess consort of Bavaria-Landshut
|align="center"| 4 December 1393husband's death|align="center"| 17 July 1404
|-
|align=center| 
|align=center| Taddea Visconti
|align="center"| Bernabò Visconti, Lord of Milan(Visconti)
|align="center"| c. 1352
|align="center"| 13 October 1364/12 August 1367
|align="center"| 13 May 1375as Duchess consort of Bavaria-Landshutc. 1392as Duchess consort of Bavaria-Ingolstadt
|align="center" colspan="2"| 28 September 1381
|align="center" rowspan="2"| Stephen III(Bavaria-Ingolstadt)
|-
|align=center| 
|align=center| Elisabeth of Cleves
|align="center"| Adolph I, Count of Cleves(De la Marck)
|align="center"| c. 1378
|align="center" colspan="2"| 16 January 1401 as Duchess consort of Bavaria-Ingolstadt
|align="center"| 26 September 1413husband's death|align="center"| c. 1424
|-
|align=center| 
|align=center| Margaret of Austria
|align="center"| Albert IV, Duke of Austria(Habsburg)
|align="center"| 26 June 1395
|align="center" colspan="2"| 25 November 1412as Duchess consort of Bavaria-Landshut1 May 1447as Duchess consort of Bavaria-Ingolstadt
|align="center" colspan="2"| 24 December 1447
|align="center"| Henry XVI(Bavaria-Landshut)
|-
|align=center| 
|align=center| Margaret of Cleves
|align="center"| Adolph I, Duke of Cleves(De la Marck)
|align="center"| 23 February 1416
|align="center" colspan="2"| 11 May 1433as Duchess consort of Bavaria-Munich and Bavaria-Straubing
|align="center"| 12 September 1435husband's death|align="center"| 20 May 1444
|align="center"| William III(Bavaria-Munich)
|-
|align=center| 
|align=center| Elisabetta Visconti
|align="center"| Bernabò Visconti, Lord of Milan(Visconti)
|align="center"| c. 1374
|align="center"| 26 January 1395
|align="center"| c. 1397as Duchess consort of Bavaria-Munichc. 1429as Duchess consort of Bavaria-Straubing
|align="center" colspan="2"| 2 February 1432
|align="center"| Ernest(Bavaria-Munich)
|-
|align=center| 
|align=center| Margaret of Burgundy
|align="center"| Philip II, Duke of Burgundy(Valois-Burgundy)
|align="center"| October 1374
|align="center"| 12 April 1385
|align="center"| 13 December 1404as Duchess consort of Bavaria-Straubing
|align="center"| 31 May 1417husband's death|align="center"| 8 March 1441
|align="center"| William II(Bavaria-Straubing)
|-
|align=center| 
|align=center| Catherine of Alençon
|align="center"| Peter II, Count of Alençon(Valois-Alençon)
|align="center"| c. 1396
|align="center" colspan="2"| 1 October 1413 as Duchess consort of Bavaria-Ingolstadt
|align="center"| c. 1443husband's imprisonment1 May 1447husband's death|align="center"| 25 June 1462
|align="center"| Louis VII(Bavaria-Ingolstadt)
|-
|align=center| 
|align=center| Elisabeth of Görlitz
|align="center"| John of Görlitz(Luxembourg)
|align="center"| November 1390
|align="center" colspan="2"| 10 March 1418as Duchess consort of Bavaria-Straubing
|align="center"| 6 January 1425husband's death|align="center"| 2 August 1451
|align="center"| John III(Bavaria-Straubing)
|-
|align=center| 
|align=center| Anna of Brunswick-Grubenhagen-Einbeck
|align="center"| Eric I, Duke of Brunswick-Grubenhagen(Brunswick-Grubenhagen)
|align="center"| c. 1414/20
|align="center"| 22 January 1437
|align="center"| 2 July 1438as Duchess consort of Bavaria-Munich
|align="center"| 29 February 1460husband's death|align="center"| c. 1474
|align="center"| Albert III(Bavaria-Munich)
|-
|align=center| 
|align=center| Margaret of Brandenburg
|align="center"| Frederick I, Elector of Brandenburg(Hohenzollern)
|align="center"| c. 1410
|align="center"| 20 July 1441
|align="center"| c. 1443as Duchess consort of Bavaria-Ingolstadt
|align="center"| 7 April 1445husband's death|align="center"| 27 July 1465
|align="center"| Louis VIII(Bavaria-Ingolstadt)
|-
|align=center| 
|align=center| Amalia of Saxony
|align="center"| Frederick II, Elector of Saxony(Wettin)
|align="center"| 4 April 1436
|align="center" colspan="2"| 21 March 1452as Duchess consort of Bavaria-Landshut
|align="center"| 18 January 1479husband's death|align="center"| 19 October 1501
|align="center"| Louis IX(Bavaria-Landshut)
|-
|align=center| 
|align=center| Jadwiga Jagiellonca
|align="center"| Casimir IV Jagiellon(Jagiellon)
|align="center"| 21 September 1457
|align="center"| 14 November 1475
|align="center"| 18 January 1479as Duchess consort of Bavaria-Landshut
|align="center" colspan="2"| 18 February 1502
|align="center"| George(Bavaria-Landshut)
|-
!Image
!Name
!Father
!Born
!Married
!BecameDuchess
!Ceased tobe Duchess
!Died
!Husband
|}

Duchy of Bavaria

Electorate of Bavaria

Kingdom of BavariaNote: All Frankish queens in the Ducal Bavaria section were also Queens consorts of Bavaria not Duchess consorts of Bavaria.

Notes

 
People from the Kingdom of Bavaria
Bavaria, Queen of
Bavaria, Duchess of
Bavaria